The London Borough of Tower Hamlets is a London borough covering much of the traditional East End. It was formed in 1965 from the merger of the former metropolitan boroughs of Stepney, Poplar, and Bethnal Green. 'Tower Hamlets' was originally an alternative name for the historic Tower Division; the area of south-east Middlesex, focused on (but not limited to) the area of the modern borough, which owed military service to the Tower of London.

The borough lies on the north bank of the River Thames immediately east of the City of London, and includes much of the redeveloped Docklands area. Some of the tallest buildings in London occupy the centre of the Isle of Dogs in the south of the borough. A part of the Queen Elizabeth Olympic Park is in Tower Hamlets.

The 2019 mid-year population for the borough is estimated at 324,745. British Bangladeshis at 32% form the largest ethnic group. The 2011 census showed Tower Hamlets to have the highest proportion of Muslims of any English local authority and that Muslims heavily outnumbered Christians. The borough has more than 40 mosques, Islamic centres and madrasahs, including the East London Mosque, Britain's largest. Brick Lane's restaurants, neighbouring street market and shops provide the largest range of Bangladeshi cuisine, woodwork, carpets and clothes in Europe. The Lane is also a major centre of hipster subculture.

In 2017 a joint study by Trust for London and New Policy Institute found Tower Hamlets to be the 2nd most deprived London borough (after Barking and Dagenham) based on an average calculated across a range of indicators; with high rates of poverty, child poverty, unemployment and pay inequality compared to other London boroughs.  However, it has the lowest gap for educational outcomes at secondary level.

The local authority is Tower Hamlets London Borough Council.

Geography

Physical geography 

Tower Hamlets is in East London, north of the River Thames. The City of London lies to the west, the London Borough of Hackney to the north, while the River Lea forms the boundary with the London Borough of Newham to the east. The River Lea also forms the boundary between the historic counties of Middlesex and Essex. The borough's Thames frontage extends from the Tower Dock inlet, immediately west of the Tower of London, through several miles of former docklands, including the Isle of Dogs peninsula, to the confluence of the Thames and Lea at Blackwall.

The areas along the Thames and Lea flood plains were historically frequently flooded, but the Thames Barrier, further east, has reduced that risk.

The Regent's Canal enters the borough from Hackney to meet the River Thames at Limehouse Basin. A stretch of the Hertford Union Canal leads from the Regent's canal, at a basin in the north of Mile End, to join the River Lea at Old Ford. A further canal, Limehouse Cut, London's oldest, leads from locks at Bromley-by-Bow to Limehouse Basin. Most of the canal tow-paths are open to both pedestrians and cyclists.

The Borough includes open spaces such as Victoria Park, King Edward Memorial Park, Mile End Park, Island Gardens and part of the Queen Elizabeth Olympic Park.

Districts within the borough

 Bethnal Green 
 Blackwall 
 Bow 
 Bromley-by-Bow
 East Smithfield
 Fish Island
 Isle of Dogs, including Canary Wharf
 Limehouse
 Mile End
 Poplar
 Ratcliff
 Shadwell
 Spitalfields
 St George in the East
 St Katharine's
 Stepney
 The Tower Liberty, taking in Tower Hill
 Wapping
 Whitechapel

History

The earliest reference to the name "Tower Hamlets" was in 1554, when the Council of the Tower of London ordered a muster of "men of the hamlets which owe their service to the tower". This covered a wider area than the present-day borough, and its military relationship with the Tower is thought to have been several centuries earlier than the 1554 record. In 1605, the Lieutenant of the Tower was given the right to muster the militia and the area east of the tower came to be a distinct military unit, officially called Tower Hamlets (or the Tower Division). The Hamlets of the Tower paid taxes for the militia in 1646. A legacy of that connection with the Tower is that residents of the modern borough can gain entrance for only a token fee of £1. this benefit isn't extended to the London Borough of Hackney, most of which once formed part of the  original Tower Hamlets.

The London Borough of Tower Hamlets forms the core of the East End. The population of the area grew enormously in the 19th century, leading to extreme overcrowding and a concentration of poor people and immigrants throughout the area. These problems were exacerbated by the construction of St Katharine Docks (1827) and the central London railway termini (1840–1875) with many displaced people moving into the area following the clearance of former slums and rookeries. Over the course of a century, the East End became synonymous with poverty, overcrowding, disease and criminality.

The area was once characterised by rural settlements clustered around the City walls or along the main roads, surrounded by farmland, with marshes and small communities by the River, serving the needs of shipping and the Royal Navy. Until the arrival of formal docks, shipping was required to land goods in the Pool of London, but industries related to construction, repair, and victualling of ships flourished in the area from Tudor times. The area attracted large numbers of rural people looking for employment. Successive waves of foreign immigration began with Huguenot refugees creating a new extramural suburb in Spitalfields in the 17th century. They were followed by Irish weavers, Ashkenazi Jews and, in the 20th century, Bangladeshis. Many of these immigrants worked in the clothing industry. The abundance of semi- and unskilled labour led to low wages and poor conditions throughout the East End. This brought the attentions of social reformers during the mid-18th century and led to the formation of unions and workers associations at the end of the century. The radicalism of the East End contributed to the formation of the Labour Party and demands for the enfranchisement of women.

Official attempts to address the overcrowded housing began at the beginning of the 20th century under the London County Council. Aerial bombing in World War II devastated much of the East End, with its docks, railways and industry forming a continual target. In the separate boroughs making up today's Tower Hamlets a total of 2,221 civilians were killed and 7,472 were injured, with 46,482 houses destroyed and 47,574 damaged. This led to some dispersal of the population to outlying suburbs. New housing was built in the 1950s for those that remained. The closure of the last of the East End docks in the Port of London in 1980 created further challenges and led to attempts at regeneration and the formation of the London Docklands Development Corporation. The Canary Wharf development, improved infrastructure, and the Queen Elizabeth Olympic Park mean that the East End is undergoing further change, but some of its districts continue to see some of the worst poverty in Britain.

Coat of arms
The coat of arms of the Borough of Tower Hamlets was granted by the College of Arms in 1965 and is composed of elements representing the maritime trades and heritage of the area. The strong links to the former Manor and Ancient Parish of Stepney and to St Dunstan's church in Stepney known as the Church of the High Seas are represented. The Manor and Parish did not have a coat of arms but the (smaller) subsequent Metropolitan Borough of Stepney did, and elements from that have been incorporated into the current design.

The Shield features:
 Ship, representing the maritime trades.
 Sprig of mulberry and a weaver's shuttle, representing the silk and other weaving activities once so important to the borough. The use of mulberry also honours the Huguenot refugees who first brought silk weaving to Tower Hamlets, and to England generally. Many council staff wear mulberry coloured uniforms.
 Blacksmiths fire tongs, the emblem of St Dunstan, the patron saint of Stepney, who had close ties to the area. Dunstan famously grabbed the devil by the nose with his tongs when he tried to tempt Dunstan.
The crest features:
 A silver representation of the (originally whitewashed) White Tower of the Tower of London, to which the original Tower Hamlets (or Tower division) was intimately linked.
 Crossed gold anchors, again representing the area's position in the Port of London.
Supporters:
 Seahorse, representing the maritime trades.
 Talbot dog, representing the Isle of Dogs.
Motto: From great things to greater, an anglicised version of the Latin motto on the arms of the Metropolitan Borough of Stepney.

The council's logo is used as an alternative to the coat of arms. It features a simplified White Tower, above a stylised representation of the Thames. This was a development of the previous logo of the White Tower, in mulberry (claret) and presented in a three-tower form, as if seen from certain quarters which obscured the furthest corner tower - and a geographically accurate representation of the local part of the Thames. This older version is still seen on many street signs.

Politics

Parliament 
For the 2017 general election, the borough was split into two constituencies:

 Bethnal Green & Bow, represented by Rushanara Ali (Labour)
 Poplar & Limehouse, represented by Apsana Begum (Labour)

Until the United Kingdom left the European Union, the borough was a part of the London constituency for elections to the European Parliament. Labour has dominated national elections in Tower Hamlets, although other left-wing parties have won seats including the Respect Unity coalition in 2005 in Bethnal Green & Bow.

London Assembly
The borough lies within the City and East constituency, one of fourteen constituencies which make up the London Assembly, and is represented by Unmesh Desai of the Labour Party.

London Borough Council

The Labour Party has dominated politics in Tower Hamlets since the borough was created in 1965, except for a period from 1986 to 1994 when the SDP–Liberal Alliance and then the Liberal Democrats controlled the council. The British National Party won its first council seat in 1993, when Derek Beackon was elected as a Millwall councillor.

In May 2010, a referendum led to the creation of a directly elected executive Mayor for the Borough. At the ensuing election in October 2010, Lutfur Rahman was elected Mayor as an independent candidate, becoming the UK's first Muslim executive mayor. Rahman had been selected as the Labour candidate for Mayor, and was a former Leader of the council. However, allegations of electoral malpractice were made against him and his supporters, and he was suspended from the Labour Party before nominations closed. He was re-elected as Mayor in May 2014.

At the May 2010 election, the composition of the council was 41 Labour, 8 Conservative, 1 Respect and 1 Liberal Democrat councillor. Since then, Respect gained a seat from Labour at a by-election, and in three separate groups a total of 8 Labour Councillors and one Conservative defected to Lutfur Rahman's independent group.
 
This shifting of political allegiances is normal for Tower Hamlets. Between the 2006 and 2010 elections, five Respect councillors defected to Labour; one Respect and one Labour councillor defected to the Conservatives; one Liberal Democrat defected to Labour; and one Labour councillor was gained through a by-election at the expense of the Liberal Democrats.

In July 2013, the Tower Hamlets (Electoral Changes) Order 2013 was passed, reducing the size of the council and creating new electoral wards made of single, two- and 3-member divisions.

In September 2013, Lutfur Rahman's independent group was officially renamed Tower Hamlets First. At the May 2014 election, the group made significant gains by winning 18 of the 45 seats, which reduced the previously Labour-held council to No Overall Control. Labour remained the largest group, with 22 councillors, a nett loss of 14, while the Conservatives had five seats, down by six. Both the Liberal Democrats and Respect Party were left with no seats after this election.

In November 2014, the Department for Communities and Local Government announced that it would appoint commissioners to take over some of the council's functions, following an inspection report by PricewaterhouseCoopers that raised several concerns over the allocation of grants. The action was supported by the Department's shadow secretary, Hilary Benn.

On 23 April 2015, the courts removed Mayor Rahman from office for electoral fraud and ordered a new election to be held. Six days later, the Electoral Commission officially withdrew Rahman's Tower Hamlets First from the electoral register, after deciding that the party did not operate a responsible financial scheme, nor ran in accordance with its initial documentation provided at registration. The decision did not in itself disband the Tower Hamlets First political group in the council, but the members splintered into the Tower Hamlets Independent Group, the People's Alliance of Tower Hamlets, and a number of Independent councillors. On 11 June 2015, an election was held to replace Rahman, and the Labour candidate John Biggs was elected as mayor, while a Labour win at a by-election enabled the party to regain overall control of the council.

As of March 2017, the composition of the council was: 
22 Labour, nine Independent Group, five People's Alliance of Tower Hamlets (PATH), five Conservatives, three ungrouped Independents, and one Liberal Democrat. By May 2018, ten councillors had joined a political group called Aspire.

At the 2018 Tower Hamlets London Borough Council election, Labour held the position of mayor and also gained twenty council seats overall, giving it control of the council. It now had 42 councillors, taking all but one of the seats won by Tower Hamlets First in 2014, and also taking seats from the Conservatives. Rabina Khan, formerly of Tower Hamlets First, but by then leader of the rival PATH, came second in the Mayoral election and was the only former Tower Hamlets First councillor to hold a seat.

As of May 2022, the councillors are: 24 Aspire, 19 Labour, 1 Conservative, and 1 Green. In February 2023, the Chief Executive of the Chartered Institute of Public Finance and Accountancy (CIPFA) raised the prospect of the authorities having to intervene in the mismanagement of the council under Aspire.

Decentralization
Since 2014, the council has embraced a policy of decentralisation by establishing neighbourhood forums. In 2014, the East Shoreditch Neighbourhood Planning Forum was set up which was followed in 2016 with the designation of a Limehouse Community Forum, an Isle of Dogs Neighbourhood Planning Forum, and a Spitalfields Neighbourhood Planning Forum.

Local landmarks

Historical landmarks
 Brick Lane
 Cable Street - site of the Battle of Cable Street
 Hawksmoor's Christ Church, Spitalfields
 Site of two historic Royal Mints
 Tower of London
 Tower Bridge
 Victoria Park
 Roman Road
 Columbia Road
 Poplar Baths

Modern landmarks

The Canary Wharf complex within Docklands on the Isle of Dogs forms a group of some of the tallest buildings in Europe. One Canada Square was the first to be constructed and is the third tallest in London. Nearby are the HSBC Tower, Citigroup Centres and One Churchill Place, headquarters of Barclays Bank. Within the same complex are the Heron Quays offices.

Part of the Queen Elizabeth Olympic Park, developed for the London 2012 Olympics, lies within the borders of Tower Hamlets.

The Embassy of China in London will move into the former Royal Mint building in East Smithfield.

Climate

Demographics

By 1891, Tower Hamlets – roughly the ancient civil parish of Stepney – was already one of the most populated areas in London. Throughout the nineteenth century, the local population increased by an average of 20% every ten years. The building of the docks intensified land use and caused the last marshy areas in the south of the parish to be drained for housing and industry. In the north of the borough, employment was principally in weaving, small household industries like boot and furniture making and new industrial enterprises like Bryant and May. The availability of cheap labour drew in many employers. To the south, employment was in the docks and related industries – such as chandlery and rope making.

By the middle of the nineteenth century, the district now recognised as Tower Hamlets was characterised by overcrowding and poverty. The construction of the railways caused many more displaced people to settle in the area, and a massive influx of Eastern European Jews at the latter part of the nineteenth century added to the population growth. This migration peaked at the end of that century and population growth entered a long decline through to the 1960s, as people moved away eastwards to newer suburbs of London and Essex. The area's population had neared 600,000 around the end of the nineteenth century, but fell to a low of less than 140,000 by the early 1980s.

The metropolitan boroughs suffered very badly during World War II, during which considerable numbers of houses were destroyed or damaged beyond use due to heavy aerial bombing. This coincided with a decline in work in the docks, and the closure of many traditional industries. The Abercrombie Plan for London (1944) began an exodus from London towards the new towns.

This decline began to reverse with the establishment of the London Docklands Development Corporation bringing new industries and housing to the brownfield sites along the river. Also contributing was new immigration from Asia beginning in the 1970s. According to the 2001 UK Census the population of the borough is approximately 196,106. According to the ONS estimate, the population is 237,900, as of 2010.

Crime in the borough increased by 3.5% from 2009 to 2010, according to figures from the Metropolitan Police, having decreased by 24% between 2003/04 and 2007/08.

Tower Hamlets has one of the smallest White British populations of any local authority in the United Kingdom. No ethnic group forms a majority of the population; a plurality of residents are white (45%), a little over two thirds of whom are White British. 32% of residents are Bangladeshi, which is the largest ethnic minority group in the borough, with Asians as a whole forming 41% of the population. A small proportion are of Black African and Caribbean descent (7%), with Somalis representing the second-largest minority ethnic group. Those of mixed ethnic backgrounds form 4%, while other ethnic groups form 2%. The White British proportion was recorded as 31.2% in the 2011 UK Census, a decrease from 42.9% in 2001.

In 2018, Tower Hamlets had the lowest life expectancy and the highest rate of heart disease of all London boroughs, along with Newham.

The 2021 census found that the borough has one of the lowest proportions of population over the age of 65 or older in England and Wales, at 5.6%.

Ethnicity

Religion and religious sites

Tower Hamlets is a religious diverse borough with various places of worship. 
According to the 2021 census, 39.9% of the population was Muslim, 22.3% Christian, 2.0% Hindu, 1.0% Buddhist, 0.4% Jewish,  0.3% Sikh, 0.5% followed some other religion, 26.6% were not affiliated to a religion and 6.9% did not state their religious views.

The following table shows the religious identity of residents residing in Tower Hamlets according to the 2001, 2011 and the 2021 censuses.

Places of Worship

There are 21 active churches, affiliated with the Church of England, which include Christ Church of Spitalfields, St Paul's Church of Shadwell and St Dunstan's of Stepney and also churches of many other Christian denominations.

There are more than 40 mosques and Islamic centres in Tower Hamlets. The most famous is the East London Mosque, one of the first mosques in Britain allowed to broadcast the adhan, and one of the biggest Islamic centres in Europe. The Maryam Centre, a part of the mosque, is the biggest Islamic centre for women in Europe. Opened in 2013, it features a main prayer hall, ameliorated funeral services, education facilities, a fitness centre and support services.
The East London Mosque has been visited by several notable people, including Prince Charles, Boris Johnson, many foreign government officials and world-renowned imams and Muslim scholars. Other notable mosques are Brick Lane Mosque, Darul Ummah Masjid, Esha Atul Islam Mosque, Markazi Masjid, Stepney Shahjalal Mosque and Poplar Central Mosque.

Other notable religious buildings include the Fieldgate Street Great Synagogue, the Congregation of Jacob Synagogue, the London Buddhist Centre, the Hindu Pragati Sangha Temple, and the Gurdwara Sikh Sangat. The Great Synagogue of London, which was destroyed during the Second World War, is located just outside the borough's boundaries, in the City.

Economy

The borough hosts the world headquarters of many global financial businesses, employing some of the highest paid workers in London, but also has a high rates of long-term illness and premature death and the 2nd highest unemployment rate in London.

Canary Wharf is home to the world or European headquarters of numerous major banks and professional services firms including Barclays, Citigroup, Clifford Chance, Credit Suisse, Infosys, Fitch Ratings, HSBC, J.P. Morgan, KPMG, MetLife, Morgan Stanley, RBC, Skadden, State Street and Thomson Reuters. Savills, a top-end estate agency recommends that 'extreme luxury' and ultra-modern residential properties are to be found at Canary Riverside, West India Quay, Pan Peninsula and Neo Bankside.

The End Child Poverty coalition published that Tower Hamlets has the highest proportion of children in poverty of any local authority in the UK at 49% (and as high as 54.5% in the Bethnal Green South ward).

Surveys and interviews conducted by the Child Poverty Action group for the council found that the Universal Credit system was deeply unpopular with low-income families in the borough and that most claimants who have used the system found it difficult to understand and experienced frequent payment errors.

Media
The East London Advertiser provides local news in print and online.

Education

The London Borough of Tower Hamlets is the local education authority for state schools within the borough. In January 2008, there were 19,890 primary-school pupils and 15,262 secondary-school pupils attending state schools there. Private-school pupils account for 2.4 per cent of schoolchildren in the borough. In 2010, 51.8 per cent of pupils achieved 5 A*–C GCSEs including Mathematics and English – the highest results in the borough's history – compared to the national average of 53.4 per cent. Seventy-four per cent achieved 5 A*–C GCSEs for all subjects (the same as the English average); the figure in 1997 was 26 per cent. The percentage of pupils on free school meals in the borough is the highest in England and Wales. In 2007 the council rejected proposals to build a Goldman Sachs-sponsored academy.

Schools in the borough have high levels of racial segregation. The Times reported in 2006 that 47 per cent of secondary schools were exclusively non-white, and that 33 per cent had a white majority. About 60 per cent of pupils entering primary and secondary school are Bangladeshi. 78% of primary-school pupils speak English as a second language.

The council runs several Idea Stores in the borough, which combine traditional library and computer services with other resources, and are designed to attract more diverse members. The flagship Whitechapel store was designed by David Adjaye and cost £16 million to build.

Universities
 Queen Mary University of London, a constituent college of the University of London, which includes Barts and The London, Queen Mary's School of Medicine and Dentistry
 London Metropolitan University
 UCL School of Management, located in One Canada Square, Canary Wharf

Further education colleges
 Tower Hamlets College, which in 2017 merged with Hackney Community College and Redbridge College to form New City College, the second largest college in London with over 20,000 students.

Schools and Sixth form colleges
 Mulberry Academy Shoreditch
 Bishop Challoner Catholic Collegiate School
 Bow School
 Central Foundation Girls' School
 George Green's School
 Lansbury Lawrence School
 Langdon Park School
 Morpeth School
 Mulberry School for Girls
 Oaklands School
 St Paul's Way Trust School
 Stepney All Saints School
 Stepney Green Maths, Computing & Science College
 Swanlea School, Business and Enterprise College
 Jamiatul Ummah School and Sixth Form
 London East Academy (East London Mosque)
 Ibrahim College
 London Enterprise Academy
 Wapping High School
 Mazahirul uloom London

Volunteering
 Volunteer Centre Tower Hamlets helps residents find volunteering work and provides support to organisations involving students volunteers.

Sports

Mile End Stadium within Mile End Park hosts an athletics stadium and facilities for football and basketball. Two football clubs, Tower Hamlets F.C. (formerly Bethnal Green United) and Sporting Bengal United F.C., are based there, playing in the Essex Senior Football League.

John Orwell Sports Centre in Wapping is the base of Wapping Hockey Club. In 2014, the club secured over £300,000 of investment to designate the centre a hockey priority facility.

A leisure centre including a swimming pool at Mile End Stadium was completed in 2006. Other pools are located at St Georges, Limehouse and York Hall, in Bethnal Green. York Hall is also a regular venue for boxing tournaments, and in May 2007 a public spa was opened in the building's renovated Turkish baths.

KO Muay Thai Gym and Apolaki Krav Maga & Dirty Boxing Academy. in Bethnal Green are the main sources for martial arts and combat sports training in the area.

The unusual Green Bridge, opened in 2000, links sections of Mile End Park that would otherwise be divided by Mile End Road. The bridge contains gardens, water features and trees around the path.

Queen Elizabeth Olympic Park

Tower Hamlets was one of five host boroughs for the 2012 Summer Olympics; the Queen Elizabeth Olympic Park was constructed in the Lea Valley. As such, the borough's involvement in the Olympics includes:

 A small part of the Olympic Park is in Bow, a district of the borough, which makes the borough a host borough. 
 The energy centre (King's Yard Energy Centre) of the Olympic Park is in the London Borough of Tower Hamlets, and gives energy to all the venues, none of which are located in Tower Hamlets. 
 The world square and the London 2012 mega-store is also in the borough. The world square is for spectators, who can buy food or drink; the world's biggest McDonald's is in the world square in Tower Hamlets. 
 The London 2012 mega-store provides official gifts and souvenirs. High Street, which is the main road to the Olympic park from west and central London, combines Whitechapel Road, Mile End Road and Bow Road. 
 Victoria Park, in Tower Hamlets, is an important part of the Olympics because spectators without tickets can watch the games on big screens (London live 2012); that park is less than a mile away from the Olympic park. The main spectator cycle park is located in Victoria park. One of the entrances to the Olympic park is in Tower Hamlets, and is called the Victoria gate.
 A few schools in Tower Hamlets have taken part in the opening and closing ceremonies of the Olympic and Paralympic games as well as all the other host boroughs.  The section of the Olympic Park in Tower Hamlets will be named "Sweetwater", one of the 5 new neighbourhoods after the games. Sweetwater will cover Tower Hamlets' part of the Olympic Park near Old Ford. 
 The Olympic marathon was planned to run through the borough but later ran through the City and Westminster. However, the U-turn was located in the borough near The Tower of London.
 Danny Boyle, the artistic director of the London 2012 opening ceremony, lives in Mile End.
 A large number of Tower Hamlets' residents became Olympic volunteers; Tower Hamlets ranks second, after neighbouring borough Newham, for the number of volunteers from the borough.

Leisure

Parks in Tower Hamlets

There are over one hundred parks and open spaces in Tower Hamlets ranging from the large Victoria Park, to numerous small gardens and squares. The second largest, Mile End Park, separated from Victoria Park by a canal, includes The Green Bridge that carries the park across the busy Mile End Road. One of the smallest at 1.19 ha is the decorative Grove Hall Park off Fairfield Road, Bow, which was once the site of a lunatic asylum. Other parks include Altab Ali Park, Mudchute Park and Grove Hall Park.

Museums

 Island History Trust
 Museum of London Docklands
 Ragged School Museum
 V&A Museum of Childhood
 Whitechapel Art Gallery
 Vagina Museum

Transport

Road 
As with most of the transport network in Tower Hamlets, several roads radiate across the Borough from the City of London. East–west routes include:

 the A11, which runs from Aldgate to the A12 near Stratford, passing through Whitechapel, Mile End, and Bow.
 the A13 (Commercial Road/East India Dock Road), which runs from Aldgate to Poplar. East of Poplar, the route continues towards Barking, Tilbury, and Southend.
 the A1203 (The Highway), which runs from Tower Hill, through Wapping, to Limehouse and Canary Wharf.

There are several north–south routes in the Borough, including:

 the A12, which begins at the A13 in Poplar and runs along the eastern edge of the Borough. The route carries traffic towards the M11 (for Stansted Airport ), Romford, and destinations in Essex, including Chelmsford and Harwich International Port. The route ultimately runs to Lowestoft in Suffolk.
 the London Inner Ring Road from Old Street to Tower Bridge.

There are three River Thames road crossings in the Borough. From west-east, these are:

 Tower Bridge (Tower Hill to Southwark and Bermondsey)
 Rotherhithe Tunnel (the A13 at Limehouse to Canada Water)
 Blackwall Tunnel (the A12 and A13 at Poplar to Greenwich)

Rail 

The principal rail services commence in the City at Fenchurch Street, with one stop at Limehouse; and Liverpool Street, with stops at Bethnal Green and Cambridge Heath. The East London Line passes from north to south through Tower Hamlets with stations at Whitechapel, Shadwell and Wapping. One entrance to Shoreditch High Street station is inside the Borough. And the North London Line passes the very north in Tower Hamlets with one entrance to Hackney Wick inside the Borough. Two Crossrail stations are currently under construction and are expected to start services in summer 2021.

Metro
The Docklands Light Railway was built to serve the docklands areas of the borough, with a principal terminus at Bank and Tower Gateway. An interchange at Poplar allows trains to proceed north to Stratford, south via Canary Wharf towards Lewisham, and east either via the London City Airport to Woolwich Arsenal or via ExCeL London to Beckton.

Three London Underground services cross the district, serving a total of 8 stations: the District and Hammersmith and City lines share track between Aldgate East and Barking. The Central line has stations at Bethnal Green and Mile End - where there is an interchange to the District line. A third central line station, at Shoreditch, has been proposed as the Central line runs within close proximity of Shoreditch High Street station. If built, it will be situated between the existing stations at Bethnal Green and Liverpool St. The Jubilee line has one stop at Canary Wharf.

List of stations
Aldgate East station
All Saints DLR station
Bethnal Green railway station
Bethnal Green tube station
Blackwall DLR station
Bow Church station
Bow Road station
Bromley-by-Bow station
Cambridge Heath railway station
Canary Wharf DLR station
Canary Wharf tube station
Crossharbour DLR station
Devons Road DLR station
East India DLR station
Hackney Wick railway station
Heron Quays DLR station
Island Gardens DLR station
Langdon Park DLR station
Limehouse station (Rail and DLR)
Mile End station
Mudchute DLR station
Poplar DLR station
Shadwell railway station
Shadwell DLR station
Shoreditch High Street railway station
South Quay DLR station
Stepney Green tube station
Tower Gateway DLR station
Tower Hill tube station
Wapping railway station
West India Quay DLR station
Westferry DLR station
Whitechapel tube station
Whitechapel railway station

In March 2011, the main forms of transport that residents used to travel to work were: underground, light rail, 24.0% of all residents aged 16–74; on foot, 7.5%; bus, minibus or coach, 7.5%; driving a car or van, 6.9%; bicycle, 4.1%; train, 3.8%; work mainly at or from home, 2.3%.

Tower Hamlets Borough Council operates a walking bus service for school pupils on agreed routes with some running every school day while and others once or twice a week depending on the number of adult volunteers involved.

Freedom of the Borough
The following people and military units have received the Freedom of the Borough of Tower Hamlets.

Individuals
 Commander John Ludgate: 25 May 2018.

Military Units
 HMS Crane, RN: 1942.
 114 (1st London) Army Engineer Regiment (TA): 27 April 1961.

See also

 List of public art in the London Borough of Tower Hamlets
 Tower Hamlets London Borough Council
 Mayor of Tower Hamlets

Notes

References

Citations

Sources 

 Cornwell, Jocelyn (1984). Hard-Earned Lives: Accounts of Health and Illness from East London, Tavistock Publications.
 Dancygier, Rafaela M. (2010). Immigration and Conflict in Europe, Cambridge University Press.
 Hill, Dave.  "Tower Hamlets: politics, poverty and faith", The Guardian, 19 September 2010. Retrieved 11 July 2011.

External links

 Tower Hamlets Council
 LBTH find your councillor
 LBTH Ward data report (2005) Information on Tower Hamlets at the ward level

 
Tower Hamlets
Tower Hamlets
1965 establishments in the United Kingdom
Populated places established in 1965